The Council of Winchester was an ecumenical council held in April 1072 at Winchester.
It attempted to settle the question of the primacy of the Archbishop of Canterbury over the English Church.
Its decision was accepted by the Catholic Church but not by the Archbishop of York.
It resulted in the Accord of Winchester when the question was further heard at Windsor.

1072 in England
Winchester
Winchester